John Cameron (26 September 1898 – 16 December 1988) was a New Zealand cricketer. He played one first-class match for Otago in 1917/18.

Cameron was born at Dunedin in 1898 and educated at Dunedin Normal School. He died in 1988 at Nelson.

References

External links
 

1898 births
1988 deaths
New Zealand cricketers
Otago cricketers
Cricketers from Dunedin